The 400 Building, also known as the First Mutual Center and Washington Federal Center, is a seven story tall building in Bellevue, Washington. When it was completed in 1967, it was the tallest building in Bellevue.

References

External links

Image (aerial), from UW Digital Collections, circa 1969
Image (ground level), from UW Digital Collections, circa 1969

 

 
 

Buildings and structures in Bellevue, Washington